Mark Hamill is an American actor with over fifty years in the entertainment industry. His breakout role of Luke Skywalker in the Star Wars franchise propelled him to popularity in film. To avoid being typecast, Hamill also acted in Broadway plays (mostly in the 1980s) and as a voice actor in several television series and films. The most popular among these is his portrayal of the Joker in multiple Batman films and television shows. His success as voice acting the Joker has led him to voice act for other supervillains in animated and live action works.

Live-action roles

Films

Television

Video games

Voice roles

Films

Television

Video games

Applications

Stage

Audio books

See also 
 Mark Hamill awards and nominations

References 

Male actor filmographies
American filmographies